Rebeca Nuez Suarez (born November 10, 1996), is a Spanish classical violinist.

Early life 
Suarez was born in Las Palmas de Gran Canaria into a family of musicians, she started her musical training with her father at the age of three, and began her violin studies with her uncle when she turned six years old. Her uncle, and aunt are both professional violinists and members of the Orquesta Filarmónica de Gran Canaria, the main symphony orchestra in the Canary Islands and resident orchestra of the Auditorio Alfredo Kraus, in Gran Canaria.

On stage since the age of seven, Rebeca has been performing publicly from the beginning of her musical studies. She made her solo debut at the age of fourteen with the Joven Orquesta de Gran Canaria under Zdzislaw Tytlak.

In their leisure time her parents became members of diverse folk music groups that explored traditional music from the Canary Islands, and they would encourage their daughter to take part in many of their concerts during her teenage years.

Career and education 
Rebeca Nuez Suarez lived in Las Palmas de Gran Canaria and trained as a violinist under the guidance of her uncle at the Academia de la Orquesta Filarmónica de Gran Canaria while attending middle school and high school at the I.E.S. Pérez Galdos.

At the age of eighteen, Nuez Suarez moved to the Netherlands to continue her education at Codarts University for the Arts, in Rotterdam, with Soviet pedagogue Natasja Morozova, and later on at the Conservatorium Maastricht, where she graduated and obtained her Bachelor Diploma. In 2019 she moved to London to continue her postgraduate studies at the Royal College of Music.

In May 2017, Nuez Suarez received an invitation to perform as a guest artist at the annual Cinémoi charity gala in Cannes, during the 70th edition of the Cannes Film Festival.

She received an invitation to perform under conductor Björn Bus on a special benefit concert to celebrate the tenth anniversary of the Dutch cultural organisation Stichting Muziek Jong voor Oud in June 2017. Maestro Björn Bus later invited her to perform once more with him at the traditional annual Christmas concert at Sint Petruskerk in Sittard, in December 2017.

Nuez Suarez has stated she is interested in contemporary classical music and collaborating with composers that are currently working. In 2018 her recording of the piece “Alone” for violin solo, composed by Spanish composer Laura Vega, was digitally released worldwide . 

In 2018 Young Classicals, a non-profit cultural platform which promotes young soloists in Europe, offered her a collaboration to record two videos with performances of works by Eugene Ysaÿe and Maurice Ravel.

In May 2019, Nuez Suarez was awarded a scholarship from La Caixa Banking Foundation Fellowships Programme, to support her postgraduate studies at the Royal College of Music.

In November 2019, Nuez Suarez released the music video "The Furies", featuring her recording of the fourth movement of the Eugene Ysaÿe's Violin Sonata Nr. 2, originally named 'Les Furies'. "The Furies" was the first classical music video by a Spanish artist to be featured in Vevo, the world's leading music video and entertainment platform. Nuez Suarez made history emerging as the first Spanish classical musician to appear in this platform.

In September 2020, Nuez Suarez started her doctoral degree in London at the Guildhall School of Music and Drama. From 2021, she continued her doctoral degree at the School of Music in the University of Leeds.

Film 
In December 2016, Nuez Suarez was briefly attached to a film project in development by British film director Brian Skeet, titled “The Spanish Version”. An undisclosed health issue prevented Skeet from continuing the project, which was shelved shortly after. 

At the 70th edition of the Cannes Film Festival Skeet said of her: “I truly believe the passion she shows for her music will be translated in film. [...] We celebrate new talent and new faces, and I can say I cannot think of anyone I want to celebrate more than this young artist”.

References

External links 
 
 Official web site

21st-century violinists
Women classical violinists
Living people
1996 births
Spanish actresses
Spanish classical violinists